Constance Rachelle Glube,  (November 23, 1931 – February 15, 2016) was the 21st Chief Justice of Nova Scotia and first female Chief Justice in Canada.

Early life
Born Constance Lepofsky in Ottawa, she was the daughter of the late Samuel (1894-1956) and Pearl (Slonensky) Lepofsky (1900-1986). Glube attended McGill University and graduated with a Bachelor of Arts degree in 1952. In 1955, she graduated from Dalhousie Law School and was called to the bar in 1956.

Judicial career
In 1982, she was appointed Chief Justice of the Supreme Court of Nova Scotia. In 1998 she was appointed Chief Justice of the Nova Scotia Court of Appeal, which included the title of Chief Justice of Nova Scotia. Glube retired effective December 31, 2004 and was replaced by J. Michael MacDonald.

One of the higher profile cases she heard, was for an injunction to halt the Richard Inquiry into the Westray Mine disaster. She ruled, on November 13, 1992, that the Inquiry was unconstitutional, because she viewed it as a criminal investigation that would force deponents to incriminate themselves. This was the first time in Canada a public inquiry was halted before any witnesses were heard. Her ruling was overturned by the Nova Scotia Court of Appeal on January 19, 1993, but did delay the inquiry until all charges went through the court system first.

Awards
In 1997 she was a recipient of the Frances Fish Women Lawyers Achievement Award.  Glube was made an Officer of the Order of Canada in 2006 for her part in serving the community as a legal trailblazer, including becoming the first female chief justice in Canada.

In 2009, the Nova Scotia branch of the Canadian Bar Association established the Contance R. Glube CBA Spirit Award to recognize achievement in law by Nova Scotian women lawyers.

Death
On February 15, 2016, Glube died in Halifax, Nova Scotia.

References

External links
 Constance Glube: Canada’s first female chief justice made history Globe and Mail obituary by Allison Lawlor, Feb. 15, 2016

Canadian Jews
Schulich School of Law alumni
Lawyers in Nova Scotia
Judges in Nova Scotia
Members of the Order of Nova Scotia
Officers of the Order of Canada
Canadian women judges
People from Ottawa
McGill University alumni
1931 births

2016 deaths